Clint Robinson is an Australian former professional rugby league footballer who played in the 1980s and 1990s. He played for Balmain in NSWRL competition.

Background
Robinson is the father of women's rugby league player Andie Robinson.

Playing career
Robinson made his first grade debut for Balmain in round 14 of the 1987 NSWRL season against the defending premiers Parramatta at Leichhardt Oval. Robinson played off the bench in a 19-0 victory. The following year, Robinson played for the majority of the season but missed out on Balmain's finals campaign and grand final loss to Canterbury. In 1990, Robinson was involved in Balmain's last two finals matches as a stand-alone entity. Robinson's final year with Balmain was in 1992 where he played 19 games and scored eight tries.

References

1969 births
Balmain Tigers players
Australian rugby league players
Rugby league wingers
Living people